The Westdene dam disaster was a bus accident that took place in Westdene, near Johannesburg, South Africa, on 27 March 1985. Of the 72 occupants, 42 drowned inside the submerged bus and two were declared deceased shortly after being taken to a nearby hospital. The remaining 30, including the bus driver, were rescued.

The accident 
The driver of a double-decker bus, 41-year-old Willem Horne, lost control and the bus crashed through barriers into the Westdene dam, a few kilometres from the centre of Johannesburg. A witness said it appeared that a tyre had blown out, sending the bus swerving into another vehicle before it smashed through a fence and plunged into the reservoir. The bus was transporting students from the local high school (Hoërskool Vorentoe).

About 3,000 people, including dozens of tearful and hysterical parents, gathered near the scene as doctors and nurses battled to revive children pulled from the submerged bus. Police said 40 students drowned in the bus and two died later in hospital. Children travelling in another bus said some students trapped on the upper deck managed to break windows and swim to safety.

Investigation 
The driver, Willem Horne, could not remember what had happened and was acquitted.

Casualties 
The following children lost their lives in the disaster:

 Blignaut, Anna (13)
 Botha, Anne-Lize (15)
 Botha, Henrietta (16)
 Brown, Caroline (unknown)
 Coetzee, Denise (16)
 Dreyer, Hendrik Johannes (13)
 Du Plooy, Linda (15)
 Du Plooy, Reinett (16)
 Du Toit, Francois (13)
 Els, Jakobus (14)
 Erasmus, Karen (16)
 Fritz, Francina (14)
 Horn, Adriana (13)
 Hurwitz, Jacqueline (13)
 Jacobs, Anel (16)
 Jooste, Lelanie (14)
 Kleinhans, Adre (17)
 Koen, Petrus Lucas (17)
 Kruger, Clasina Inalize (16)
 Kruger, Maria Catharina (14)
 Lira, Riaan (unknown)
 Ludick, Madeleine (12)
 Mans, Cornelius (14)
 Marshall, Elmarie (16)
 Marx, Conrad (16)
 McLaughlin, Belinda (15)
 Meyer, Catharina Maria (14)
 Miles, Mary-Ann (16)
 Morris, Anna Jacoba (14)
 Ouwenkamp, Albertus (13)
 Pieters, Tanya (15)
 Pretorius, Connie (17)
 Pretorius, Elizabeth Marlene (15)
 Rautenbach/Buitendag, Thelma (unknown)
 Reynders, Hester (15)
 Strydom, Charl (13)
 Swanepoel, Vinette (13)
 Swart, Andries Johannes (13)
 Van Der Westhuizen, Petrus Coenrad (13)
 Van Heerden, Elsa (17)
 Van Tonder, Anna Christina (14)
 Venter, Deon Andre (16)

Of the 42 fatalities, 39 were given a public mass funeral and buried in separate graves in the "Heroes Acre" at Westpark Cemetery on 1 April 1985, while two of the deceased were cremated and their ashes given to their families, and one victim was returned to her native Orkney, North West and interred at a cemetery there.

An annual memorial service is held every 27 March at Johannesburg's Vorentoe High School, where most of the victims and survivors had attended school.

References 
 Joburgnews

External links 
 Vorentoe High School
 Westdene 1985

Transport in Johannesburg
Bus incidents in South Africa
1985 road incidents
1985 in South Africa
March 1985 events in Africa
1985 disasters in South Africa